DNA-directed RNA polymerases I and III subunit RPAC2 is a protein that in humans is encoded by the POLR1D gene.

Interactions 

POLR1D has been shown to interact with POLR1C.

References

Further reading